The West Wight Potter 15 is an American trailerable sailboat that was designed by Stanley T. Smith and Herb Stewart as a cruiser and first built in 1979.

The West Wight Potter 15 is a development of the British West Wight Potter 14.

Production
The design has built since 1979 by International Marine of Inglewood, California, United States and remains in production. A total of 2600 boats have been completed.

Design
The design originally had a gunter rig and was built from plywood. Stewart used a plywood hull as a plug and created a mold for making fiberglass hulls from At the same time the gunter rig was changed to a Marconi rig. The design uses a long sail batten to hold the leech out, giving an appearance similar to a gaff rig.

The West Wight Potter 15 is a recreational sailboat, built predominantly of fiberglass, with mahogany wood trim. It has a fractional sloop rig with aluminum spars. The hull has a spooned raked stem, a conventional transom, a transom-hung, kick-up rudder controlled by a tiller and a weighted, galvanized steel lifting keel. The hull design incorporates three skegs to reduce heeling. It displaces  and carries  of ballast. The boat is equipped with foam flotation and its self-righting and self-bailing.

The design has sleeping accommodation for two people, with two  bunks in the bow cabin. The cabin has  of headroom and the companionway hatch folds into a small table. A cockpit tent is an option.

The design has undergone continuous improvement over its production run. A mark II version was introduced in 1982.

Operational history
The boat has been sailed single-handed from Seattle, Washington to Ketchikan, Alaska and also from England to Sweden, across the North Atlantic Ocean.

Sailrite notes of the design, "the West Wight Potter 15 sloop is one of the best known small cruising sailboats. The West Wight Potter 15 has a cockpit that will accommodate 4 adults and a cabin that will sleep two. Designed for safety the Potter 15 has a self bailing cockpit, is self-righting, unsinkable and extremely stable under sail."

In a 2010 review Steve Henkel wrote, "best features: Long-distance cruisers have taken modified versions from California to Hawaii, and from Seattle to Alaska, indicating relatively good stability and ease of handling, despite her tiny lightweight hull and narrow beam, With very shallow draft and a relatively flat V-bottom, she is beachable and easy to launch; her “unsinkable” hull has positive foam flotation. Worst features: She has very little space below {ignoring the hard-to-access space under the cockpit). A centerboard fills the central space in the cabin, so there's no footwell: you must sit cross-legged on the berthtop, and finding a convenient place to use a portable toilet is problematical. Using the head in the cockpit, under a boom tent for privacy, seems to be the most practical alternative. Light-air performance is below average."

See also
List of sailing boat types

Related development
West Wight Potter 19

References

External links

1970s sailboat type designs
Sailing yachts
Trailer sailers
Sailboat type designs by Stanley T. Smith
Sailboat type designs by Herb Stewart
Sailboat types built by International Marine